Barrier Ford is a hamlet in the Canadian province of Saskatchewan.

Demographics 

References

Bjorkdale No. 426, Saskatchewan
Designated places in Saskatchewan
Organized hamlets in Saskatchewan